The 1880 Illinois gubernatorial election was held on November 2, 1880.

Incumbent Republican Governor Shelby Moore Cullom defeated Democratic nominee Lyman Trumbull who won 50.56% of the vote. Cullom's victory was the seventh consecutive victory for the Republican Party.

Republican John Marshall Hamilton was elected Lieutenant Governor of Illinois. At this time in Illinois history, the Lieutenant Governor was elected on a separate ballot from the governor. This would remain so until the 1970 constitution.

General election

Candidates
Lyman Trumbull, Democratic, former U.S. Senator
Shelby Moore Cullom, Republican, incumbent Governor
Uriah Copp Jr., Prohibition
Erick Johnson, Communist
S. R. Pratt
Alson Jenness Streeter, Greenback, former State Representative, Greenback nominee for Illinois's 10th congressional district in 1878

Results

References

Notes

Bibliography
 

Governor
1880
Illinois
November 1880 events